= Amy-Marie Merrell =

Amy-Marie Merrell is a Las Vegas community activist for sex workers and those affected by human trafficking.

== Education and early career ==
Merrell attended a university in New York where she earned a graduate degree in non-profit management. Her first experience was connecting jazz musicians of New York to healthcare and employment.

Merrell had her first experience with the stigmatization around sex workers while living in Portland in 2009. She was walking home one night when she witnessed a woman being physically assaulted. A nearby security guard witnessed the event but refused to get involved because the woman was a prostitute that hangs out around the area. Merrell ran home to call 911, when the police arrived both individuals were gone. The police officers that responded to the scene noted that the woman may of had warrants and would've been arrested following the event. When meeting with the chief of police she was told that if she really wanted to make a difference she would need to do it from the ground up. That is when she turned her focus to working with houselessness nonprofits, domestic violence shelters, and anti-trafficking groups.

== Career ==
Merrell is executive director of The Cupcake Girls, a 501c3 nonprofit which helps sex worker and those involved with human trafficking. The organization was started by Heather Hoover in Las Vegas, NV in 2011. The Las Vegas branch serves about 250-300 individuals per year. The organization has 2 main headquarters: Las Vegas, NV and Portland, OR.

Las Vegas has the third-highest rate of human trafficking in the U.S. according to data from the National Human Trafficking Hotline. The Cupcake Girls offer referrals, services for aspects of life, and mentorship. They partner with doctors, dentists, lawyers and more to provide help for all of lives struggles. They offer "trauma informed" trainings for the community to help promote understanding of trauma related to trafficking.

Merrell lobbied for Strippers' Bill of Rights (ESSB6105) writing to the Seattle times regarding the bill. The stigma of sex work has allowed exploitation of sex workers to go unregulated. The bill would provide much needed reform by instituting minimum safety and health standards. Merrell wrote "This bill mandates basic protections such as dedicated security personnel, secure dressing rooms, comprehensive training on workplace sexual harassment prevention and protocols for handling violent patrons." Merrell alongside The Cupcake Girls strive to empower consensual sex in a safe manner for all parties.

Merrell worked with organizations such as Signs of HOPE in Las Vegas to help provide the community with the realities of human trafficking. Many of those that are trafficked have a history of previous sexual assaults and unstable home as children. Typically, these individuals are taken in by people who offer help for basic things like food, housing, and finances. These individuals often battle addiction which makes it difficult for victims to leave. State supporters like government officials and researchers look at ways to reduce the number of sex trafficking cases in Nevada.

Amy-Marie and others involved in The Cupcake Girls push to empower these individuals and surround them with love and support. The Cupcake Girls built a downtown resource center where victims can access food, support classes, and care. The center comprises a marketplace, wellness areas, and working space to maximize the impact on the community. The central location was carefully planned out to make it convenient for those that need help. Merrell expresses that the biggest hurdles are lack of funding and community education on the horrors of sex trafficking and the obstacles that must be overcome. She hope that the public facing building will be a benefit for the non-profit.
